Zuchang Gymnasium is an indoor sporting arena located in Jinjiang, Fujian, China.  The capacity of the arena is 6,000 spectators and opened in 2002.  It hosts indoor sporting events such as basketball and volleyball.  It hosts the Fujian Xunxing of the Chinese Basketball Association.

References

Indoor arenas in China
Sports venues in Fujian
Sport in Quanzhou